The Ancient and Primitive Rite, also called the Order of the Ancient and Primitive Rite of Memphis-Mizraim, is a Masonic Rite. First popularized by John Yarker, it is generally considered clandestine by Masonic organizations within the UGLE framework.

History
John Yarker's Ancient and Primitive Rite grew out of the Rite of Memphis-Misraim, which itself was a combination, formed in 1881, of the Rite of Memphis and the Rite of Misraïm, both of which appeared in France at the beginning of the 19th century.

Yarker had been introduced to the Rite of Memphis in 1871 during a visit to New York,. As well as establishing the Ancient and Primitive Rite, Yarker would later become Deputy International Grand Master (1900) and International Grand Master (1902) of the Rite of Memphis-Misraim. He formed the Ancient and Primitive Rite with 33 degrees by eliminating duplicative degrees from the Rite of Memphis-Misraïm.

Yarker's Rite claimed a history going to Napoleon Bonaparte's armies in Egypt, and traced the development of the Rite until his present day. He professed also that "Its Rituals embrace all Masonry, and are based on those of the Craft universal; they explain its symbols, develope [sic] its mystic philosophy, exemplify its morality, examine its legends, tracing them to their primitive source, and dealing fairly and truthfully with the historical features of Symbolical Masonry. They contain nothing in their teaching but what Mahommedan, Christian, Jew, Buddhist, Brahmin, or Parsee may alike acknowledge." Until Yarker's death in 1913, there was never more than a total of 300 members.

Degrees
The Rite of Memphis confers a set of degrees, numbered from 4° through 32°:

First Series: Chapter

Class I: Intro
1° – Entered Apprentice
2° – Fellow Craftsman
3° – Master Mason

Class II: College
4° – Discreet Master
5° – Sublime Master
6° – Knight of the Sacred Arch
7° – Knight of the Secret Vault

Class III: Chapter
8° – Knight of the Sword
9° – Knight of Jerusalem
10° – Knight of the Orient
11° – Knight of the Rose Croix

Second Series: Senate

Class IV: Senate
12° – Knight of the Red Eagle
13° – Knight of the Temple
14° – Knight of the Tabernacle
15° – Knight of the Serpent
16° – Knight Sage of Truth
17° – Knight Hermetic Philosopher

Class V: Areopagus
18° – Knight Kadosh
19° – Knight of the Royal Mystery
20° – Knight Grand Inspector

Third Series: Sublime Council

Class VI: Consistory
21° – Grand Installator
22° – Grand Consecrator
23° – Grand Eulogist
24° – Patriarch of Truth
25° – Patriarch of the Planispheres
26° – Patriarch of the Vedas

Class VII: Council
27° – Patriarch of Isis
28° – Patriarch of Memphis
29° – Pontiff of the Mystic City
30° – Perfect Pontiff, Sublime Master of the Great Work

Official

Grand Tribunal
31° – Grand Defender
32° – Prince of Memphis
33° – Grand Sovereign

Bibliography

Notes

References
 Prescott, Andrew. The Cause of Humanity: Charles Bradlaugh and Freemasonry
 Boris Nicolaevsky, "Secret Societies and the First International," in The Revolutionary Internationals, 1864–1943, ed. Milored M. Drachkovitch (Stanford, 1966), 36–56.

See also
 List of Masonic Rites
 Rite of Memphis-Misraim

Masonic rites